Steve Edwards was an American nuclear physicist and Professor Emeritus at Florida State University (FSU) in Tallahassee, Florida.

Education

Edwards earned B.S. and M.Sc. degrees in physics from Florida State University in 1952 and 1954, respectively.  In 1960, he completed his Ph.D. from Johns Hopkins University with the thesis "EXCHANGE EFFECTS IN DIRECT REACTIONS".

Career

Edwards returned to FSU in 1960 as an Assistant Professor of Physics rising to Professor in 1969.  He remained part of the faculty in the Department of Physics for more than 40 years.  His research focused on theoretical nuclear physics and he helped establish the newly formed FSU nuclear physics group as one of the top programs in the nation.  He wrote the physics textbook "Physics: A Discovery Approach." He served as department chair from 1973 to 1979.

Edwards served as Faculty Senate President from 1983-1985  until he was appointed Dean of the Faculties (1985) and added the title of Deputy Provost in 1986. He served in this position until his retirement in 2003.

Steve Edwards was a colleague of Paul Dirac, a Nobel Prize winning research professor from Florida State University.

In 2003, Edwards was awarded the James D. Westcott Distinguished Service Award by Florida State University.  He was the sixth person to receive this honor.

Personal life

Steve Edwards was born June 16, 1930 and raised in Gadsden County, Florida.  In 1965, he married Helen Carothers who was the daughter of Milton W. Carothers, Jr., former FSU administrator.  They were married for 47 years, until her death in 2012, and had two daughters, Ashley Carothers Edwards and Leigh Holladay Edwards.

He died in his Tallahassee home on May 27, 2016.

Publications
Steve Edwards, "Exchange terms in direct nuclear reaction theories," Nuclear Physics 47 652 (1963) 
Hamza, Khidhir A. -A. and Edwards, Steve, "Coulomb Forces in the Three-Body Problem," Physical Review 181 1494-1502 (1969)

Books
Steve Edwards, Physics: A Discovery Approach, Wiley & Sons

References

2016 deaths
Florida State University faculty
Florida State University alumni
People from Quincy, Florida
American nuclear physicists
20th-century American physicists
1930 births